The Capital City Classic is a men's college basketball series between the VCU Rams and the Richmond Spiders. It often has a public school (VCU) vs private school (Richmond) mentality.

From 1995 to 2001, it was a conference rivalry in the Colonial Athletic Association, before Richmond left for the Atlantic 10 Conference (A10). In 2012, it once again became a conference rivalry with VCU's arrival in the A10. The rivalry has been known under a number of different names over the years, including the Black & Blue Classic, before being renamed the Capital City Classic for the 2014–15 season.

All-time results

Richmond victories are shaded in ██ blue. VCU victories shaded in ██ gold.

Other sports

Women's basketball

Baseball

Men's soccer

Women's soccer

Women's lacrosse 
-->

References

College basketball rivalries in the United States
Richmond Spiders men's basketball
VCU Rams men's basketball
Sports rivalries in Virginia